Maleficent ( or ) is a fictional character who appears as the main antagonist in Walt Disney Productions' 16th animated feature film, Sleeping Beauty (1959). She is represented as an evil fairy and the self-proclaimed "Mistress of All Evil" who, after not being invited to a christening, curses the infant Princess Aurora to "prick her finger on the spindle of a spinning wheel and die" before the sun sets on Aurora's sixteenth birthday.

Maleficent is based on the evil fairy godmother character in Charles Perrault's fairy tale Sleeping Beauty, as well as the villainess who appears in the Brothers Grimm's retelling of the story, Little Briar Rose. Maleficent was animated by Marc Davis.

She is voiced by Eleanor Audley, who earlier voiced Lady Tremaine, Cinderella's evil stepmother, in Cinderella (1950).

A revision of the character appeared as the protagonist in the 2014 live-action film Maleficent, portrayed by Angelina Jolie, who reprised the role in the 2019 sequel Maleficent: Mistress of Evil. This version of Maleficent is portrayed as a sympathetic character, who is misunderstood in trying to protect herself and her domain from humans.

Development
The character was animated by Marc Davis who also animated Aurora in the film. She was aptly named "Maleficent" (an adjective which means "doing evil or harm"). In determining Maleficent's design, standard depictions of witches and hags were dismissed as Davis has opted for an elegant, sinister, green-skinned beauty, depicted as "vain femme fatale, utilizing a classic archetype of a bad woman." According to Davis, Maleficent "was designed like a giant vampire bat to create a feeling of menace."

She was voiced by Eleanor Audley, who had previously performed Lady Tremaine, Cinderella's evil stepmother, in Cinderella. Audley also provided some live-action recording for both of these characters, to inspire the animators. In addition, dancer Jane Fowler performed some live-action reference for Maleficent. Animators Ollie Johnston and Frank Thomas, in their book The Disney Villain, describe animating Audley's voice as "a difficult assignment but a thrilling one, working to that voice track with so much innuendo mixed in with the fierce power."

It was long rumored that Maleficent's likeness was inspired by actress Maila Nurmi, best known for her character Vampira, a camp icon of the 1950s. In 2014, entries were discovered in Nurmi's journals describing sessions for Walt Disney in November of 1956. Walt Disney was subsequently able to find archival documents corroborating Nurmi's participation as a "live-action reference" model for the character.

For the scene when Maleficent transforms into a dragon in the original film, she was animated by Eric Cleworth, who said that the dragon was modeled on a rattlesnake, with "powerful muscles moving a bulky body over the rocky terrain." Sound effects artist Jimmy MacDonald searched for the sound of a dragon's fiery breath by requesting the United States Army to send him some training films on flame throwing. These films provided just the right sound for him.

Appearances

Sleeping Beauty

In the animated film, where she is voiced by Eleanor Audley, Maleficent arrives at King Stefan and Queen Leah's castle during the christening of their newborn daughter, Princess Aurora. She expresses displeasure about not receiving an invitation, to which one of the good fairies named Merryweather replies that she was unwanted. Angered, she prepares to leave. Queen Leah asks her if she is offended, causing Maleficent to deny her rage, and subsequently offers to bestow a "gift" on Aurora to prove that she "bears no ill will". Maleficent confirms that Aurora will grow in grace and beauty, "beloved by all who know her", but as revenge for not being invited by the kingdom, she places a curse on Aurora so that before the sun sets on her sixteenth birthday, she will prick her finger on the spindle of a spinning wheel and die. Before the Royal Guards can seize her, Maleficent disappears, laughing triumphantly. Though Merryweather still has her gift to bestow, she cannot dispel Maleficent's power, but she can only weaken the curse so that Aurora will fall into a deep sleep instead, which requires a kiss from her true love to awaken her.

Later, at her castle in the Forbidden Mountains, a frustrated Maleficent asks her bestial army why they have been unable to find Aurora, who had been hidden and brought up by the three good fairies. Maleficent learns that they have focused on searching for a baby the entire time, even though 16 years have passed. She flies into a destructive rage, and soon desperately instructs her pet raven, Diablo, to find Aurora. The bird manages to succeed due to a magical quarrel between Merryweather and Flora, which exposes their location.

On the evening of Aurora's sixteenth birthday, after the three fairies have momentarily left the depressed princess alone in a castle room, Maleficent visits Aurora in the form of a will-o-the-wisp, luring the princess to a tower room where Maleficent transforms into a spinning wheel. The fairies, realizing their mistake, pursue Aurora to the tower room, trying to prevent her from touching the spindle. Unfortunately for them, Aurora pricks her finger on the spindle, fulfilling the curse. When Flora, Merryweather, and Fauna arrive too late, Maleficent appears and taunts three of her arch-rivals into defeating her. The evil fairy reveals the now sleeping Aurora on the floor, shocking the fairies as Maleficent disappears, cackling, leaving the fairies heartbroken of what happened.

Later on, Maleficent and her goons capture Prince Phillip, Aurora's true love, and imprisons him. Maleficent then rests well, thinking she has triumphed. Maleficent later wakes up and by seeing that Diablo has been turned to stone, she discovers that the fairies have freed Phillip from her dungeon. She climbs to the top of one of her castle's towers and proceeds to blast Phillip with lightning, and after the good fairies foil these attempts, she summons a forest of thorns, through which Phillip slices his way out.  Enraged, she blows away and confronts him in front of King Stefan's castle, and transforms into a huge dark dragon. The three fairies cast an enhancing enchantment on Phillip's Sword of Truth, which he throws into Maleficent's heart, mortally wounding her before she falls off the crumbling cliff to her death.

Maleficent

The 2014 live-action reboot presents Maleficent as a good-hearted but tragic fairy who defends the Moors, a realm of supernatural beings, from neighboring humans. She is played by Angelina Jolie.

Prior to sporting her iconic dark attire, Maleficent had a pair of giant wings and wore a brown leather dress, with sandals and an anklet. She could heal a tree's broken branch just by touching it, and shared an immense fondness with all the denizens of her mystical domain. Maleficent befriends a thieving peasant boy named Stefan, upon being alerted to his presence by a trio of pixies: Knotgrass (Imelda Staunton), Thistletwit (Juno Temple), and Flittle (Lesley Manville). 

As a young adult, Maleficent is betrayed by Stefan...who uses iron to burn off her wings so that he can succeed King Henry. (Henry declared a bounty on Maleficent's life, after she gravely felled him while thwarting his armed invasion of the Moors.) After claiming a raven named Diaval (Sam Riley) as her henchman, Maleficent renames herself from guardian of the Moors to ruler of same. Both her clothing and her realm turn dark, reflecting the hatred with which she is now consumed. When she learns that now-King Stefan and his Queen Leila have a newborn daughter named Aurora (Elle Fanning), Maleficent acts in the name of what she considers poetic justice...by cursing the newborn Aurora to fall into a deathlike slumber on her 16th birthday; the spell can be broken only by the kiss of true love, which neither Maleficent nor Stefan believe in. Knotgrass, Thistletwit, and Flittle are assigned to look after Aurora until after her 16th birthday; the pixies prove to be grossly incompetent and negligent, however. In order to ensure that her curse comes to pass, Maleficent cares for and - when required - protects the child from afar. Eventually, as Aurora grows into an industrious and sweet-tempered young woman, Maleficent recognizes the folly of punishing Stefan's daughter for something he alone did. This tender regard for Aurora enables Maleficent to undo the damage which she herself inflicted; after Philip's kiss fails to break the curse (because he's not yet truly in love with Aurora), Maleficent voices her regrets and herself kisses Aurora's brow. Roused from her enchanted sleep, and now fully aware of her father's true nature, Aurora foils his efforts to destroy Maleficent by returning the dark fairy's severed wings. Completely stripped of her bitterness and thirst for vengeance, Maleficent declares an end to her feud with Stefan. But the king, driven by shame too great to bear, attempts to kill her and himself...only to take a fatal fall from his own castle's highest turret.  

Following Aurora's ascension over her late parents' domain, Maleficent crowns her to rule the Moors as well...as Diaval and Phillip look on proudly.

Maleficent: Mistress of Evil

Angelina Jolie reprised the role in Maleficent: Mistress of Evil, in which Maleficent's relationship with Aurora was tested. Other fairies of her species appeared, led by Conall (Chiwetel Ejiofor). In the course of the film, Prince Philip's mother Queen Ingrith (Michelle Pfeiffer) attempts to provoke a war between the humans and the fairies by creating the impression that Maleficent has cast another curse on the king, forcing Maleficent to flee the kingdom only to be rescued by others of her kind. During this time, Maleficent's species is identified as 'Dark Fey', although Maleficent's powers are unique to her due to her being the latest reincarnation of the powerful Phoenix. The queen nearly destroys the fairies after devising a cloud of red dust that will turn all fairies exposed to it into plants and luring them into a church for Aurora's wedding, but during the Dark Fey's attack on the kingdom, Aurora learns the truth and is able to convince both sides to stand down, Philip appealing to his own soldiers while Aurora confronts Maleficent. After asserting that she still regards Maleficent as her mother, Aurora is knocked off a tower by the queen, but Maleficent is able to save Aurora, ending the conflict when she breaks the curse on the King and turns the Queen into a goat. With peace restored, Maleficent walks Aurora down the aisle for her wedding to Philip, and later assures Aurora that she will return when their first child is born.

Other appearances

Fantasmic!
Maleficent appears in the Disney theme park attraction Fantasmic!, voiced by Linda Gary.

House of Mouse
Maleficent is a recurring character in the animated series Disney's House of Mouse, voiced by Lois Nettleton. In the episode "Halloween With Hades", Hades falls in love with her. She also appeared as a villain in the series' direct-to-video film Mickey's House of Villains where she takes part in the "It's Our House Now" musical number along with the other villains.

Once Upon a Time
A version of Maleficent appears in the ABC television series Once Upon a Time, played by Kristin Bauer van Straten. She was slain by Emma Swan in dragon form in the first season finale, but was later resurrected. She acts as one of the main antagonist in the fourth season, baing part of a group known as the Queens of Darkness, along with Ursula and Cruella De Vil, and temporarily the Evil Queen. In dragon form, she mothered Lily (Nicole Muñoz (teen)/Agnes Bruckner (adult)), and did not know the identity of the father. In the series finale, it is mentioned in dialogue that Lily discovered that her father was Zorro, whom no one knew could become a dragon.

Descendants franchise
Kristin Chenoweth played Maleficent in Disney's original Disney Channel film Descendants, which follows the teenage children of Disney's iconic heroes and villains, including Maleficent's daughter Mal. In Descendants 3, it is revealed that Mal's father is Hades.

Video games
Maleficent is the final boss in the North American version of the video game Mickey Mousecapade created in 1987 for the Nintendo Entertainment System.

Maleficent appears as a major antagonist in the Kingdom Hearts video game series, voiced by Susanne Blakeslee in the English versions and Toshiko Sawada in the Japanese versions. She seeks to take control of the many worlds and engulf them in darkness, with Pete acting as her second-in-command. She has appeared in every game in the series except for Kingdom Hearts: 358/2 Days.

Maleficent is a playable character in the Disney Infinity video games series, voiced by Rajia Baroudi and sporting her modified appearance from the live-action Angelina Jolie film. As with the other playable characters in the game, a tie-in figure for Maleficent was also released.

Maleficent acts as the main antagonist in the video game Disney Magic Kingdoms, where she casts a curse on the titular Kingdom. She also usually appears in limited time Events known as Tower Challenges, where she takes part in the Boss Battle of the event.

Printed media
Maleficent is the protagonist in Serena Valentino's Disney Villains book franchise.

Maleficent was featured in the book sequel to Sleeping Beauty called Maleficent's Revenge.

In the book series by Ridley Pearson, Kingdom Keepers, Maleficent appears as one of the first Overtakers encountered as she intends to leave the confines of Disney World to take over the world.

Reception

The original version of Maleficent has been called as "one of the most sinister Disney Villains". She is generally described as an "evil, cold hearted fairy who can curse an innocent baby just because she is not invited to the christening ceremony." Guillermo del Toro has stated that along with Vermithrax in Dragonslayer, Maleficent is his favorite cinematic, Disney dragon. Voice actress Eleanor Audley and supervising animator Marc Davis were also praised for their work on the character. In 2016, The Frisky described Maleficent and the Evil Queen as "two of the best-realized female villains in movie history."

Maleficent's live-action version from the film series of the same name has received critical attention, different from its original, animated counterpart. Benjamin Justice describes this version of Maleficent as "a full person, good and evil, powerful and vulnerable, vengeful and loving" and notes that, while she and Aurora value heterosexual relationships and love, neither of them "let the idea of [one true love] define the arc of the personal or public lives." When analyzing Maleficent's disability after she loses her wings due to Stephan's betrayal, Colleen Elaine Donnelly compares her role to that of Elphaba in Wicked, explaining that in both cases, the story "intends to reform the stereotype of the evil witch by providing a backstory."

References

External links

Disney Archives - Maleficent

Disney animated villains
Fairy royalty
Female characters in animation
Female film villains
Fictional dragons
Fictional fairies and sprites
Fictional kidnappers
Fictional queens
Fictional therianthropes
Film characters introduced in 1959
Sleeping Beauty (1959 film) characters
Animated characters introduced in 1959
Video game bosses
Maleficent (franchise)